The settlement of the Eastern Alps region by early Slavs took place during the 6th to 8th centuries. 
It is part of the southward expansion of the early Slavs which would result in the characterization of the South Slavic group, and would ultimately result in the ethnogenesis of present-day Slovenes.
The Eastern Alpine territories concerned comprise modern-day Slovenia, Eastern Friuli and large parts of modern-day Austria (Carinthia, Styria, East Tyrol, Lower Austria and Upper Austria).

Historical background 

The migration of Slavic peoples from their homeland began in roughly the late 4th to early 5th century, as Germanic peoples started moving into the territory of the Roman Empire. The migrations were stimulated by the arrival of Huns into Eastern Europe. The Germanic peoples subsequently fought for control over territories in the eastern part of the disintegrating Roman Empire. Slavic tribes were part of various tribal alliances with the Germanic (Lombards, Gepids) and Eurasian (Avar, Bulgar) peoples.

Evidence 
The prevailing view on the Slavic settlement of the Eastern Alps is based mostly on evidence deduced from archeological remains (many of which have been discovered due to the extensive highway constructions in post-1991 Slovenia), ethnographic traces (patterns of rural settlement and land cultivation), as well as on the ascertainments of historical linguistics (including toponymy). Besides, it is fully confirmed by the relatively few available contemporary mentionings and early historical sources (such as Historia Langobardorum by Paulus Diaconus or letters from Pope Gregory I). Another important evidence of Slavic advances is the progressive decline of ancient Christian dioceses in the respective areas. Alpine Slavs, including Carantanians, mainly originate from Slavs of Prague-Korchak culture. In the 10th century were significantly influenced by Bijelo Brdo culture of the Pannonian Slavs.

Phases of the settlement 

The first phase of Slavic settlement in the Eastern Alps region is dated around the year 550 and originated in the area of modern-day Moravia (i.e., the West Slavic speaking branch). 
From there, Slavic peoples moved southward into the territory of the former Roman province of Noricum (modern-day Upper and Lower Austria regions). Subsequently, they progressed along the valleys of Alpine rivers towards the Karawanks range and towards the settlement of Poetovio (modern-day Ptuj), where the decline of the local diocese is recorded before 577.

The second phase of Slavic settlement came from the south and took place after the retreat of Lombards into Northern Italy in 568. The Lombards agreed to cede the relinquished territory to their new allies, the Avars, who at that time were the overlords of Slavs. Avars first appeared in Europe around 560 when they reached lower Danube. In 567 the Avars and Lombards jointly defeated the Gepids. After the Lombards moved to Italy in 568, the Avars became the nominal rulers of both the Pannonian plain (which they had conquered by 582) and the adjacent Eastern Alps region. The Slavic-Avar progress towards the Eastern Alps is traceable on the basis of synodal records of the Aquileian metropolitan church which speak of the decline of ancient dioceses (Emona, Celeia, Poetovio, Aguntum, Teurnia, Virunum, Scarabantia) in the respective area. In 588 the Slavs reached the area of the Upper Sava River and in 591 they arrived to the Upper Drava region where they soon fought with the Bavarians who were led by king Tassilo I. In 592 the Bavarians won, but in 595 the Slavic-Avar army gained victory and thus consolidated the boundary between the Frankish and Avar territories. Between 599 and 600 the Slavs pushed through Istria and the Karst region towards Italy.

Driven by German colonization of Austria, Slavs settled the entire Kras and the Gail valley between 600 and the 8th century. From there, they penetrated Friuli in Val Canale and in the secondary valleys (Dogna, Val Raccolana, Val Resia), going even in the valleys of rivers Degano, But and Tagliamento. Other areas from which Slavs penetrated were the valleys of rivers Isonzo and Vipava, where they entered in the eighth century. In this area they had already appeared during the Slavic-Avar raids of early 600. Finally there were raids and clashes caused by Slavic bands in the valleys of rivers Torre and Natisone up to 720. The attempt by Slavs to penetrate violently westward probably ended after they had been defeated by the Lombards at Lauriana, in 720. Subsequently, Slavic settlers were invited by the patriarchs of Aquileia to repopulate the areas of Middle and Lower Friuli to the river Livenza, devastated by the Magyar incursions.

Avar domination over the Slavs persisted until mid 620s. In 623 the Slavs, led by Frankish merchant Samo, rebelled against the Avars. In 626 the Avars were ultimately defeated at Constantinople, after which Samo became the ruler of the first historically known Slavic polity, Samo's Tribal Union, which persisted until his death in 658. Subsequently, a smaller Slavic principality emerged around 660, known as Carantania, and was absorbed into the Frankish Empire in 745.

Slavs and the original population 
After settling in the Eastern Alps region, Slavs subsequently subjugated the original Romanised population, which had dwelt in the territory of the former Noricum province and in its cities. In late Antiquity, the original population evaded Slavic settlers by moving into remote and elevated places, usually hills, where they built fortifications; such examples are Ajdna in the Karawanks mountain ridge and Rifnik near modern-day Celje. However, recent archeological research shows that even certain well-fortified cities in the lower lying areas managed to protect themselves from the invaders. Part of the native population escaped into Italy and to the cities along the Adriatic coast, among them Civitas Nova (modern-day Novigrad). Many natives were enslaved by the Slavs (an old Slavic term for slaves was krščenik, meaning a Christian, as the natives were Christians), some, however, assimilated with Slavs.

Slavs referred to the Romanised aborigines as Vlahi or Lahi. Certain place names in modern-day Slovenia, such as Laško, Laški rovt, Lahovče, and others, bear witness to this. Also, a number of river names in modern-day Slovenia, like Sava, Drava, Soča, as well as the geographic name Carniola (Slovenian Kranjska) were adopted from the Romanised aborigines.

See also 
 Sclaveni
 Antes
 Paganism in the Eastern Alps
 Venetic theory
 Eastern Alps

References

Sources 
 G. Barbina, E. Bartolini, G. Bergamini, C. C. Desinan, G. Frau, G. C. Menis, V. Zoratti, Codroipo, Codroipo, Il ponte, 1981
 Rajko Bratož, "Gli inizi dell'etnogenesi slovena : fatti, tesi e ipotesi relativi al periodo di transizione dall'eta antica al medioevo nel territorio situato tra l'Adriatico e il Danubio". In publication: La cristianizzazione degli Slavi nell'arco alpino orientale, ur. Andrea Tilatti. Nuovi studi storici, 69. Roma, Gorizia, 2005, str. 145–188. 
 G. G. Corbanese, Il Friuli, Trieste e l’Istria: dalla Preistoria alla caduta del Patriarcato d’Aquileia, Grande Atlante Cronologico, Udine, Del Bianco, 1983
 Bogo Grafenauer, "Naselitev Slovanov v Vzhodnih Alpah in vprašanje kontinuitete" [Slavic settlement of the Eastern Alps and the issue of continuity], Arheološki vestnik 21-22 (1970–71), p. 17–32;
 Mitja Guštin, ed., "Zgodnji Slovani: zgodnjesrednjeveška lončenina na obrobju vzhodnih Alp = Die frühen Slawen: frühmittelalterliche Keramik am Rand der Ostalpen". Ljubljana, 2002. 
 Hans-Dietrich Kahl, "Der Staat der Karantanen: Fakten, Thesen und Fragen zu einer frühen slawischen Machtbildung im Ostalpenraum". Ljubljana, 2002. 
 
 Peter Štih, "Ob naselitvi Slovanov vse pobito?" [Did Slavic settlement result in the killing of the entire population?]. In publication: Množične smrti na Slovenskem: 29. zborovanje slovenskih zgodovinarjev [Massive killings in Slovenia: 29th conference of Slovenian historians], Ljubljana, 1999, p. 79–93. 
 Peter Štih, Janez Peršič, "Problem langobardske vzhodne meje" [The issue of the Lombard eastern frontier], Zgodovinski časopis = Historical Review 35 (1981), p. 333–341. 
 Aleš Žužek, "Naselitev Slovanov v vzhodnoalpski prostor" [Slavic settlement of the Eastern Alps area], Zgodovinski časopis = Historical Review 61 (2007), p. 261–287.

External links 

Medieval Slovenia
Medieval Austria
Cultural history of Slovenia
History of the Alps